Isidor George Beaver (December 1859 – 24 October 1934), often misspelled "Isidore" and frequently initialized as "J. G. Beaver", was an architect from England who had a substantial career in Adelaide, South Australia and Melbourne, Victoria. He was significant in the early history of ice skating in Australia.

History

Beaver's father was Louis Beaver (c. 1819–1879) of Manchester. He emigrated to Australia, and in 1884 had an office on Victoria Square, Adelaide. H. E. Fuller served his articles with him for four years from 1884. He joined with partners Edmund Wright and James Henry Reed to form Wright, Reed & Beaver. In 1886 their design for the Jubilee Exhibition Building was awarded second prize. In 1889 they won a design contest for the National Mutual Life Association's new Melbourne premises at the south-west corner of Queen and Collins Streets, and set up offices in Queen Street, headed by Beaver, to oversee the project, of eight storeys, later known as Goode House, and now the home of the Bank of New Zealand Australia.

The partnership was dissolved in 1893, and Beaver remained in Melbourne with offices at 125 Queen Street. In 1894 he relocated to the Fourth Victoria Building, 243 Collins Street. R. H. Solly trained as a junior under Beaver and was for four years his chief draftsman before becoming an architect with Wunderlich Ltd. (who had offices in the same building). In 1901 his office was located at 11 Elizabeth Street then moved to Altson's Buildings, 82 Elizabeth Street, on the Collins Street corner. In 1915 Arthur William Purnell joined him to form the partnership Beaver & Purnell which lasted until 1925.

A notable design of this time was the Wattle Path Palais de Danse, one of the world's largest dance halls, opened in 1922, architects Beaver & Purnell, though their relative inputs are not yet known. The building became a film studio, Efftee Studios, for Frank W. Thring in December 1933; Thring abandoned the project in 1937. H. H. Kleiner and his wife transformed it into the St. Moritz Ice-skating Palais, which opened in 1939 and finally closed in 1982.

He died at his home, 23 Wynstay Road, Armadale and was buried in the Melbourne Cemetery, Carlton, Victoria

Associations
He was a vice-president of the South Australian Architects Association in 1885.
He was hon. treasurer of the Royal Victorian Institute of Architects in 1910.

Works
He was associated with William McMinn in the design of extensions to the Masonic Hall in Waymouth Street, Adelaide.
Supervised National Mutual Life building (now Goode House) at 389-399 Collins St, Melbourne, contribution to design not known.
Extensions to the Fourth Victorian Building Society's building at 243 Collins Street (which same building he later occupied) in 1894.
He designed the Outpatients' wards at the Queen Victoria Hospital, opened in 1902, and nine years later their operating theatre dedicated by the National Council of Women as a memorial to Dr. Mary Page Stone.
He designed the Toorak Bowling Club's original wooden pavilion, which was erected in 1914 and still stands, heritage listed.
"Carinya", the Toorak mansion built in 1926 for Herbert William Lee, was designed by Beaver and Purnell.

Other interests
He conducted classes in technical drawing at the School of Design from 1889.

He was a member, with his yacht Bonita, of the Holdfast Bay Yacht Club, and swam competitively in the Glenelg pool.

From 1901 he rode to hounds with the Melbourne Hunt Club, and was still riding regularly until two months before his death in October 1934.

From 1913 he was a member of the Toorak Bowling Club.

He was an expert skater, a member of the Original London Skating Club and a director of the company  (H. W. Allen, I. G. Beaver, H. Kendall, Dr. C. F. Macgillicuddy, A. G. Outhwaite, and V. C. Turner) which was formed in 1926 to take over the lease on the Melbourne Glaciarium, 10 City Road South Melbourne, when it was facing closure.  The company became Glaciarium Ltd. sometime before the 1930 season opened, with L. R. Molloy, manager of the Glaciarium, as managing director. The Glaciarium showed a profit almost every year until the 1950s.

Beaver was president of the National Ice Skating Association in 1928 and perhaps longer, president of the Victorian Ice Skating Association in 1932. He was a sponsor of ice hockey, and one of the first four teams in Melbourne (and in Australia) was named "The Beavers" in recognition of his support.

Family
Beaver never married. The chief beneficiary of his will was a niece. Although a member of a Jewish family, there is (unlike his sisters) no mention of him in the Jewish press.

Evelyn Salenger (1847–1934) of Sydney, and Laura Schlank (1851–1918) of Adelaide were sisters who emigrated to South Australia aboard the SS Somersetshire in 1870. Laura was married to Salis Schlank ( –1892), a well-known manufacturing jeweller.

Albert Beaver (died 16 March 1909), who was arrested for embezzlement in 1897, and then released under curious circumstances was a brother.

References 

Architects from Adelaide
Architects from Melbourne
Australian ice hockey people
1859 births
1934 deaths
English emigrants to colonial Australia